Peter Lüscher (born 14 October 1956) is a former Swiss alpine ski racer who won an overall World Cup in 1979.

Biography
Born in Romanshorn in the canton of Thurgau, he won the overall World Cup title in 1979 and a silver medal at the Alpine Ski World Championships in 1982.

He is married to Fabienne Serrat.

World Cup results

Season standings

Season titles

Individual races
 6 wins – (1 DH, 1 SG, 1 SL, 3 K)
 25 podiums

References

External links
 
 

1956 births
Living people
People from Arbon District
Swiss male alpine skiers
FIS Alpine Ski World Cup champions
Alpine skiers at the 1976 Winter Olympics
Alpine skiers at the 1980 Winter Olympics
Olympic alpine skiers of Switzerland
Sportspeople from Thurgau
20th-century Swiss people